Renne may refer to:

People
 Renne Hughes, an artist from Texas
 Renné Toney, a female bodybuilder
 Louise Renne, a lawyer in California
 Paul Renne, a professor at the University of California, Berkeley
 Roland Renne (1905–1989), former president of Montana State University-Bozeman

Toponyms 
 Steinerne Renne, a waterfall in Germany
 Rivière le Renne (English: Reindeer River), a tributary of the Yamaska River in the Acton Regional County Municipality, Quebec, Canada